Diana Palmer may refer to:

Diana Palmer (author), pseudonym of the American romantic novelist Susan Spaeth Kyle
Diana Palmer (The Phantom), a character in the American comic strip The Phantom